Gary Lee may refer to:
Gary A. Lee (born 1933), U.S. Representative from New York
Gary Yia Lee (born 1949), Hmong anthropologist and author based in Australia
Gary Lee (American football) (born 1965), played for the Detroit Lions
Gary Lee, Australian artist, winner of the 2022 NATSIAA Telstra Works on Paper Award 
Gary Lee (journalist) (born 1956), wrote for Time and the Washington Post
Gary Lee (politician) (born 1947), American politician in North Dakota
Geddy Lee (born 1953), Canadian musician, born Gary Lee Weinrib

See also